Paul Dodd may refer to:

 Paul Dodd (mayor), mayor of Galway, 1656–1657
 Paul Dodd (footballer) (born 1937), Australian rules footballer
 Paul A. Dodd (1902–1992), American educator, economist, and labor arbitrator